Behind the Red Door may refer to:

Behind the Red Door (film), a 2003 English drama film
Behind the Red Door (The Americans), an episode of The Americans